Youth programs are particular activities designed to involve people between the ages of 10 and 25. Activities included are generally oriented towards youth development through recreation, social life, prevention, intervention, or education. During youth programs participants might be involved in sports, religion, community service, youth activism, youth service, or outdoor education. Topics covered include youth empowerment, consumer rights, youth-led media, and youth rights. 

Youth program focuses and activities generally depend on the location, culture, class, education, and ideals of the individuals and organizations involved. These programs are offered by government agencies, nonprofit organizations, and businesses around the world.

See also
 Youth development
 Youth participation
 List of youth organizations
 Interagency Working Group on Youth Programs

Examples
 4-H 
 EU Youth in Action Programme
 YMCA
 Scouting
 TrashTag Challenge
 Boys and Girls Club
 National Youth Rights Association 
 Snowboard Outreach Society
 Youth model governments
 European Voluntary Service
 Elevate (organization)
 buildon
 Girls With A Purpose
 The First Tee
 Civil Air Patrol
 United States Naval Sea Cadet Corps